Annual marches, protests or gatherings take place around the world for transgender issues, often taking place during the time of local Pride parades for LGBT people. These events are frequently organized by trans communities to build community, address human rights struggles, and create visibility.

ExisTransInter March Paris

Created in 1997 and held each year since 2002 is the Existrans march in Paris. Since 2007 the March also includes intersex demands. The current name of the ExisTransInter is "ExisTransInter, la marche des personnes trans et intersexes et de celles qui les soutiennent" ("ExisTransInter, the March of the trans and intersex persons and those who support them").

San Francisco Trans March

The San Francisco Trans March is an annual gathering and protest march in San Francisco, California, that takes place on the Friday night of Pride weekend, the last weekend of June. It is a trans and gender non-conforming and inclusive event in the same spirit of the original gay pride parades and dyke marches. It is one of the few large annual transgender events in the world and has likely been the largest transgender event since its inception in June 2004. The purpose of the event is to increase visibility, activism and acceptance of all gender-variant people.

Toronto Trans March
The Toronto Trans March was founded in 2009 by Karah Mathiason and typically takes place on the Friday of Toronto Pride Week. The trans community in Toronto had seen resistance to the idea of a trans march for years, and in 2009 Karah Mathiason decided to create the march for herself. In 2009, Toronto Pride attempted to confine the newly formed Trans March to the sidewalks of Church Street up to Wellesley Street. Instead, participants took to the streets and marched past the barriers on Wellesley Street. Since 2009, Toronto Pride has consistently stood in the way of the Trans March, often trying to confine it to minuscule portion of Church Street while the Toronto Dyke March and Toronto Pride Parade march down Yonge Street.

In 2012, Toronto Pride attempted to restrict the Trans March from Norman Jewison Park down Church Street where vending booths were set up and pedestrians were still walking around the street. The "official" march received relatively little attention and occurred amidst oblivious pedestrians until it finally reached Wood Street. Upon arriving at Wood Street, marchers who were aware of alternative plans split off and marched down Yonge Street to Dundas Avenue.

In 2013, Toronto Pride again attempted to mislead marchers, but this time activists prevailed. The Toronto Trans March began at Norman Jewison Park and marched down Yonge Street to Allan Gardens on Sherbourne and Carlton. It was the largest unified Trans March that has occurred in Toronto to date. Between 1000 and 2000 people are believed to have marched in the Toronto Trans March 2013.

Community Conflicts
During the organisation of the Toronto Trans March 2013, a conflict occurred following a decision made during one organising meeting to accept a request by the LGBT Consultative Committee of the Toronto Police Services to march in the Trans March. Many in the community objected to a police contingent of the march, because they felt that it disregarded the ongoing reality of police brutality and harassment against trans people in Toronto.
 In the end, a community letter was presented to the LGBT Consultative Committee and the contingent did not march.

Other cities
In 2007 a Trans March started in Minneapolis-St. Paul.

In Philadelphia, the first Philly Trans March was held in 2010.

In London, the first Trans Pride march was held on 14 September 2019.

In Japan, the first Trans March was held in Shinjuku, Tokyo by Transgender Japan (TGJP) on 20 November 2021. About 500 people participated. The second Trans March is planned to be held on 12 November 2022.

See also

 Dyke March
 International Transgender Day of Visibility
 List of LGBT awareness days
 List of LGBT events
 National Trans Visibility March
 Transgender flag
 Transgender rights movement
 Trans October

References

External links

 San Francisco Trans March

International observances
LGBT civil rights demonstrations
LGBT culture in San Francisco
Pride parades in the United States
Transgender events
Transgender organizations in the United States

fr